The First Civil Service Commissioner heads the Civil Service Commission, a statutory body which ensures that appointments to the Civil Service in the United Kingdom are made openly and on merit, and hears appeals from civil servants under the Civil Service Code.

The post was created in 1855 following publication of the Northcote–Trevelyan Report by Charles Trevelyan and Stafford Northcote that advocated the decoupling of appointments of senior civil servants from ministers to insure the impartiality of the Civil Service. Following a report of the Committee on Standards in Public Life, "Defining the Boundaries within the Executive: Ministers, special advisers and the permanent Civil Service" in 2003, the appointment of the First Civil Service Commissioner is made by Government after consultation with the leaders of the main opposition parties. They are then appointed by the Queen under Royal Prerogative.

List of first civil service commissioners
Sir Edward Ryan (1855–1875)
John Pakington, 1st Baron Hampton (1875–1880)
George Byng, Viscount Enfield (later 3rd Earl of Strafford) (1880–88)
...
William Courthope (1892–1907)
Lord Francis Hervey (1907–1909)
Sir Stanley Leathes (1910–1927)
Sir Roderick Meiklejohn (1927–1939)
Sir Percival Waterfield (1939–1951)
Sir Paul Sinker (1951–1954)
Laurence Helsby, Baron Helsby (1954–1959)
Sir George Mallaby (1959–1964)
Sir George Abell (1964–1967)
John Hunt (1967–1971)
Sir Kenneth Henry Clucas (1971–1974)
Dr Fergus Allen (1974–1981)
Angus Fraser (1981–1983)
Dennis Trevelyan (1983–1989) 
John Holroyd (1989–1993) 
Dame Ann Bowtell (1993–1995)
Sir Michael Bett (1995–2000)
Usha Prashar, Baroness Prashar (2000–2005)
Janet Paraskeva (2006–2010)
Mark Addison (2011) (interim)
Sir David Normington (2011–2016)
Kathryn Bishop (2016) (interim)
Ian Watmore (2016–2021)
Rosie Glazebrook (2021 interim)
Baroness Gisela Stuart (2022 - present)

References

Further reading

External links
Office of the Civil Service Commissioners

Government occupations
Government of the United Kingdom
Civil Service (United Kingdom)
National civil service commissions
1855 establishments in the United Kingdom